Taha Abdul-Basser was a Muslim Chaplain at Harvard University.

Early life and education
Abdul-Basser was born and raised in Brooklyn, New York City, where he attended Prep for Prep as well as The Dalton School. His father, Hasan Abdul-Basser, converted to Islam at age sixteen upon the advice of his mentor, Malcolm X.

Abdul-Basser graduated from Harvard College with a bachelor's degree (A.B.) in the Comparative Study of Religion in 1996. He also completed a Master's (A.M.) in Arabic and Islamic Studies from the Department of Near Eastern Languages and Civilizations at Harvard University and is an ABD from the same department. In addition, he has studied traditional Islamic disciplines with scholars from the Sudan, Tanzania, Yemen and Bahrain. He has received traditional licenses (ijazat; sing. ijazah) in Islamic law and ethics, Prophetic traditions (hadith) as well as other disciplines from several teachers, including Shaykh Nizam Yaquby; Shaykh Musa Maduri of Al-Azhar University; the qadi and mufti, Shaykh Muhammad al-Umrani; and Shaykh Dr. Muhammad Ghunaym. In Yemen, he studied at the Spectra Institute of Language Studies as well as other smaller institutes. Currently, Abdul-Basser is a Ph.D. candidate in the Department of Near Eastern Languages and Civilizations at Harvard working on a dissertation on post-formative Islamic ethics and traditional Arabic literary theory. He lives in a Boston suburb with his wife, Monifa Matthew (Harvard College `98) and their three children.

Career
Abdul-Basser is Principal and Co-Founder of the Straightway Ethical Advisory LLC, a  consulting group offering Islamic ethical advisory consultation services to the sharia-compliant financial services sector. He serves as a consultant and researcher in the field of Islamic jurisprudence, specifically Islamic finance. In particular, he consults on investment banks, retail banks, investment funds, financial and legal advisories and other for-profit and not-for-profit entities.

In 2008, Abdul-Basser was a featured panelist in the International Quality and Productivity Center's Islamic Finance World Summit held in New York City, New York. In 2009, he was a conference speaker at the Milken Institute's Global Conference in Los Angeles, California. In early 2010, Abdul-Basser served as a panelist on alternative dispute resolution in Islamic law at the Annual Meeting of the Association of American Law Schools (AALS). He also has given lectures and presented papers on Islamic financial ethics at The Wharton School of the University of Pennsylvania, Boston University, and Harvard Law School. Regarding the latter, he has served as a panelist, moderator, and banquet speaker at the biennial Harvard University Forum on Islamic Finance.

Abdul-Basser has also served as a lecturer in Arabic at Boston University and a Senior Tutorial Advisor at Harvard University's Department of Near Eastern Languages and Civilizations.

In his role as Harvard's Muslim Chaplain, Abdul-Basser has advocated multi-faith dialogue and cooperation. He has been a part of multi-faith panels and discussion groups, as well as Jewish/Muslim text study groups.

Boardmanships
Abdul-Basser serves on the Shariah board of Wahed Invest and Javelin Investment Management.

Criticism
In 2009, an article published in The Harvard Crimson derided one of Abdul-Basser's email responses to a question posed by a Harvard student on the topic of apostasy in Islam. Abdul-Basser responded to the student's question in his role as Harvard Muslim Chaplain. Abdul-Basser's original email appeared on private Harvard email lists but was leaked to the website TalkIslam.com, generating interest outside the Harvard community. Opinion articles on the email also appeared in the Harvard Crimson and in the Washington Times. Abdul-Basser answered the student's question by stating, "[...] it would be better if people were to withhold from debating such [topics], since they tend not to have the requisite familiarity with such issues and competence to deal with them. Debating about religious matter is impermissible, in general, and people rarely observe the etiquette of disagreements." The email continues, “There is great wisdom (hikma) associated with the established and preserved position (capital punishment), and so, even if it makes some uncomfortable in the face of the hegemonic modern human rights discourse, one should not dismiss it out of hand." In subsequent statements, Abdul-Basser said that he was explaining to a student the traditional position of Islamic legal scholars and not advocating their position. “I have never expressed the position that individuals who leave Islam or convert from Islam to another religion must be killed. I do not hold this opinion personally,” Abdul-Basser said. He also explained that the “hikma” mentioned in the email was in reference to the scholars who have historically debated the legal issues on apostasy in Islamic law. The full text of the email was published online by the website TalkIslam.com.

References

Harvard Graduate School of Arts and Sciences alumni
American imams
21st-century imams
Muslim chaplains
Living people
Religious leaders from New York City
Year of birth missing (living people)